Zhijiang North railway station is a railway station, which is located in Zhijiang City, which is part of the Yichang prefecture-level city, Hubei Province, People's Republic of China. It is served by the Hanyi Railway (construction of which started in 2008), which operated by Wuhan Railway Bureau, China Railway Corporation.

Structure

Service

History
It is opened on July 1, 2012.

Nearby station

References

External links
 Construction Plan

Railway stations in Hubei
Yichang